Alexander Allan was a Scottish mechanical engineer. He was born at Montrose, Angus, in 1809 and died at Scarborough, Yorkshire on 2 June 1891.

Biography
Alan was born in Montrose, Angus, Scotland in 1809.  He undertook a apprenticeship to Mr. Gibb, a millwright.  In 1832 aged about 23 he took a position at Robert Stephenson and Company, Newcastle upon Tyne.  By 1834 he had moved to Liverpool and taken up a position with George Forrester and Company who were about to begin building railway locomotives.

Allan was works manager for George Forrester and Company until 1840. He was the engineer sent for a year to supervise the maintenance of the three Forrester engines Vauxhall, Dublin and Kingstown for the first year of their service at Dublin and Kingstown Railway in 1834.

From 1843 to 1853 he was Works Manager at the Crewe Works of the Grand Junction Railway, later London and North Western Railway, under Francis Trevithick. He later claimed the credit for designing the Crewe type locomotive with inclined cylinders and double frames, but this claim has been challenged.  From 1853 to 1865 he was Locomotive Superintendent of the Scottish Central Railway.  Allan was an original member of the Institution of Mechanical Engineers in 1847.

Inventions
Allan made a number of inventions, including a balanced slide valve, but the best-known is his straight-link valve gear of 1855.

See also
 George Forrester and Company
 Locomotives of the London and North Western Railway

References

Sources

 
 
 
 
 

1809 births
1891 deaths
19th-century Scottish people
Scottish inventors
Scottish railway mechanical engineers
People from Montrose, Angus
Locomotive builders and designers
19th-century British inventors
19th-century British engineers